This is a list of diplomatic missions of Morocco, excluding honorary consulates.

Africa

 Luanda (Embassy)

 Cotonou (Embassy)

 Ouagadougou (Embassy)

 Bujumbura (Embassy)

 Yaoundé (Embassy)

 Bangui (Embassy)

 N'Djamena (Embassy)

 Kinshasa (Embassy)

 Cairo (Embassy)

 Malabo (Embassy)

 Addis Ababa (Embassy)

 Libreville (Embassy)

 Accra (Embassy)

 Conakry (Embassy)

 Bissau (Embassy)

 Abidjan (Embassy)

 Nairobi (Embassy)

 Tripoli (Embassy)
 Benghazi (Consulate-General)

 Antananarivo (Embassy)

 Bamako (Embassy)

 Nouakchott (Embassy)
 Nouadhibou (Consulate-General)

 Niamey (Embassy)

 Abuja (Embassy)

 Kigali (Embassy)

 Dakar (Embassy)

 Pretoria (Embassy)

 Khartoum (Embassy)

 Tunis (Embassy)

 Lusaka (Embassy)

Americas

 Buenos Aires (Embassy)

 Brasília (Embassy)

 Ottawa (Embassy)
 Montreal (Consulate-General)
 Toronto (Consulate-General)

 Santiago (Embassy)

 Bogotá (Embassy)

 Havana (Embassy)

 Santo Domingo (Embassy)

 San Salvador (Embassy)

 Guatemala City (Embassy)

 Mexico City (Embassy)

 Panama City (Embassy)

 Asuncion (Embassy)

 Lima (Embassy)

 Gros Islet (Embassy)

 Washington, D.C. (Embassy)
 New York (Consulate-General)

Asia

 Baku (Embassy)

 Manama (Embassy)

 Dhaka (Embassy)

 Beijing (Embassy)

 New Delhi (Embassy)

 Jakarta (Embassy)

 Baghdad (Embassy)

 Tel Aviv (Liaison Office)

 Tokyo (Embassy)

 Amman (Embassy)

 Astana (Embassy)

 Kuwait City (Embassy)

 Beirut (Embassy)

 Kuala Lumpur (Embassy)

 Muscat (Embassy)

 Islamabad (Embassy)

 Ramallah (Representative Office)
 Gaza (Consulate Annex)

 Manila (Embassy)

 Doha (Embassy)

 Riyadh (Embassy)
 Jeddah (Consulate-General)

 Seoul (Embassy)

 Damascus (Embassy)

 Bangkok (Embassy)

 Ankara (Embassy)
 Istanbul (Consulate-General)

 Abu Dhabi (Embassy)
 Dubai (Consulate-General)

 Hanoi (Embassy)

 Sanaa (Embassy)

Europe

 Vienna (Embassy)

 Brussels (Embassy)
 Antwerp  (Consulate-General)
 Liège (Consulate-General)

 Sofia (Embassy)

 Zagreb (Embassy)

 Prague (Embassy)

 Copenhagen (Embassy)

 Helsinki (Embassy)

 Paris (Embassy)
 Bastia (Consulate-General)
 Bordeaux (Consulate-General)
 Colombes (Consulate-General)
 Dijon (Consulate-General)
 Lille (Consulate-General)
 Lyon (Consulate-General)
 Marseille (Consulate-General)
 Montpellier (Consulate-General)
 Orléans (Consulate-General)
 Orly (Consulate-General)
 Pontoise (Consulate-General)
 Rennes (Consulate-General)
 Strasbourg (Consulate-General)
 Toulouse (Consulate-General)
 Villemomble (Consulate-General)

 Berlin (Embassy)
 Düsseldorf (Consulate-General)
 Frankfurt (Consulate-General)

 Athens (Embassy)

 Rome (Embassy)

 Budapest (Embassy)

 Dublin (Embassy)

 Rome (Embassy)
 Bologna (Consulate-General)
 Milan (Consulate-General)
 Naples (Consulate-General)
 Palermo (Consulate-General)
 Turin (Consulate-General)
 Verona (Consulate-General)

 The Hague (Embassy)
 Amsterdam (Consulate-General)
 's-Hertogenbosch (Consulate-General)
 Rotterdam (Consulate-General)
 Utrecht (Consulate-General)

 Oslo (Embassy)

 Warsaw (Embassy)

 Lisbon (Embassy)

 Bucharest (Embassy)

 Moscow (Embassy)

 Belgrade (Embassy)

 Madrid (Embassy)
 Algeciras (Consulate-General)
 Almería (Consulate-General)
 Barcelona (Consulate-General)
 Bilbao (Consulate-General)
 Girona (Consulate-General)
 Las Palmas de Gran Canaria (Consulate-General)
 Murcia (Consulate-General)
 Palma de Mallorca (Consulate-General)
 Seville (Consulate-General)
 Tarragona (Consulate-General)
 Valencia (Consulate-General)

 Stockholm (Embassy)

 Bern (Embassy)

 Kyiv (Embassy)

 London (Embassy)

Oceania

 Canberra (Embassy)

Multilateral organisations
 African Union
Addis Ababa (Permanent Mission to the African Union)

Brussels (Permanent Mission to the European Union)

Cairo (Permanent Mission to the Arab League)

Geneva (Permanent Mission to the United Nations and other international organizations)
New York (Permanent Delegation to the United Nations)

Gallery

See also
 Foreign relations of Morocco
 Visa policy of Morocco

Notes

References

External links
Ministry of Foreign Affairs and Cooperation of Morocco

 
Morocco
Diplomatic missions